Ptilothrix deusta is a sedge in the family Cyperaceae found in south eastern Australia. It is commonly seen in wet sandy soils in heathland, growing from 30 to 60 cm tall. This is one of the many plants first published by Robert Brown with the type known as "(J.) v.v." appearing in his Prodromus Florae Novae Hollandiae et Insulae Van Diemen in 1810 as Carpha deusta.  It was transferred to the genus, Ptilothrix, in 1994 by Karen Wilson. The genus name is derived from ancient Greek, meaning feather hair. The specific epithet deusta is derived from the Latin with a meaning of burnt.

References

Cyperaceae
Flora of New South Wales
Flora of Queensland
Poales of Australia
Plants described in 1810
Taxa named by Robert Brown (botanist, born 1773)